Proto (stylized in all caps) is the third studio album by American electronic musician Holly Herndon. It was released on May 10, 2019, via 4AD. It includes the singles "Godmother" and "Eternal", with the video of the latter accompanying the album announcement. The album was called a collaboration with an AI named "Spawn" co-created by Herndon and Mat Dryhurst.

Background
The album was created in a collaboration with an AI program named "Spawn", created by Herndon and Mat Dryhurst, and located in a "DIY souped-up gaming PC". It features "live vocal processing and timeless folk singing" with an "emphasis on alien song craft". The album features "live training" sessions during which vocalists recruited by Herndon and Dryhurst would teach Spawn how to interpret sounds. Herndon has said that her aim is to make technology seem less "dehumanizing".

Track listing

Charts

References

External links
Official page

2019 albums
Holly Herndon albums
4AD albums